The 1978 season ended with the Los Angeles Dodgers winning their second straight National League pennant and losing to the New York Yankees in the World Series again. Dodger coach Jim Gilliam died at the end of the season and his uniform number, 19, was retired by the team prior to Game 1 of the World Series; the team also wore a black memorial patch with Gilliam's number during the World Series. Unlike the previous Dodger team, no member of the team hit 30 home runs after seeing four members hit that mark the previous season (the team leader was Reggie Smith, with 29).

Offseason 
 November 23, 1977: Dennis Lewallyn was purchased from the Dodgers by the Minnesota Twins.
 January 31, 1978: Elías Sosa was purchased from the Dodgers by the Pittsburgh Pirates.

Regular season

Season standings

Record vs. opponents

Opening day lineup

Notable transactions 
 May 17, 1978: Glenn Burke was traded by the Dodgers to the Oakland Athletics for Billy North.
 May 20, 1978: Mike Garman was traded by the Dodgers to the Montreal Expos for Larry Landreth and Gerry Hannahs.
 July 1, 1978: The Dodgers traded players to be named later to the Houston Astros for Joe Ferguson and cash. The Dodgers completed the deal by sending Rafael Landestoy to the Astros on July 7 and Jeff Leonard to the Astros on September 11.

Roster

Notable events

On August 20, before a night game in New York against the New York Mets, Steve Garvey approached Don Sutton in the Dodgers' clubhouse over an article in The Washington Post in which Sutton was quoted as saying to Tom Boswell:

"All you ever hear about on our team is Steve Garvey, the all-American boy...well, the best player on this team for the past two years--and we all know it--is Reggie Smith.  Reggie doesn't go out and publicize himself.  He doesn't smile at the right people or say the right things.  Reggie's not a façade or a Madison Avenue image.  He's a real person."

Garvey and Sutton wrestled for two minutes in the clubhouse over Sutton's words and had to be pulled apart by teammates.  Neither was seriously injured.  Both had facial scratches and bruises and Garvey had a bloodshot left eye where it appeared a finger or thumb had been inserted by Sutton.  Days later, Sutton publicly apologized for the incident, but not to Garvey personally.

Player stats

Batting

Starters by position 
Note: Pos = Position; G = Games played; AB = At bats; H = Hits; Avg. = Batting average; HR = Home runs; RBI = Runs batted in

Other batters 

Note: G = Games played; AB = At bats; H = Hits; Avg. = Batting average; HR = Home runs; RBI = Runs batted in

Pitching

Starting pitchers 
Note: G = Games pitched; IP = Innings pitched; W = Wins; L = Losses; ERA = Earned run average; SO = Strikeouts

Other pitchers 
Note: G = Games pitched; IP = Innings pitched; W = Wins; L = Losses; ERA = Earned run average; SO = Strikeouts

Relief pitchers 
Note: G = Games pitched; W = Wins; L = Losses; SV = Saves; ERA = Earned run average; SO = Strikeouts

Postseason

1978 National League Championship Series 

The Dodgers defeated the Philadelphia Phillies 3 games to 1 in the NLCS.

Game 1 
October 4, Veterans Stadium

Game 2 
October 5, Veterans Stadium

Game 3 
October 6, Dodger Stadium

Game 4 
October 7, Dodger Stadium

1978 World Series 

The Dodgers again lost to the New York Yankees in the World Series.

AL New York Yankees (4) vs. NL Los Angeles Dodgers (2)

Game 1 
Tuesday, October 10, 1978, at Dodger Stadium in Los Angeles

Game 2 
Wednesday, October 11, 1978, at Dodger Stadium in Los Angeles

Game 3 
Friday, October 13, 1978, at Yankee Stadium in Bronx, New York

Game 4 
Saturday, October 14, 1978, at Yankee Stadium in Bronx, New York

Game 5 
Sunday, October 15, 1978, at Yankee Stadium in Bronx, New York

Game 6 
Tuesday, October 17, 1978, at Dodger Stadium in Los Angeles

Awards and honors 
Gold Glove Awards
Davey Lopes
NL Player of the Month
Rick Monday (April 1978)
NL Player of the Week
Rick Monday (Apr. 17–23)
Steve Garvey (Aug. 14–20)

All-Stars 
1978 Major League Baseball All-Star Game
Steve Garvey, starter, first base
Rick Monday, starter, outfield
Ron Cey, reserve
Tommy John, reserve
Davey Lopes, reserve
Reggie Smith, reserve
Major League Baseball All-Star Game MVP Award
Steve Garvey
TSN National League All-Star
Davey Lopes
Steve Garvey

Postseason 
NLCS Most Valuable Player
Steve Garvey

Farm system 

Teams in BOLD won League Championships

Major League Baseball Draft

The Dodgers drafted 35 players in the June draft and 12 in the January draft. Of those, seven players would eventually play in the Major Leagues.

The Dodgers did not have a first round pick this year in the June draft as their pick was given to the Pittsburgh Pirates as compensation for their signing of free agent pitcher Terry Forster. In the second round, they selected SS Clay Smith from Northwest Classen High School in Oklahoma City, Oklahoma. Smith played in the Dodgers farm system through 1981, hitting .271 in 277 games in the rookie leagues and class-A before he was released.

This draft netted the Dodgers two key players for their championship teams of the 1980s. They drafted Mike Marshall in the 6th round and Steve Sax in the 9th. Marshall would hit 148 homers in 11 seasons and made the All-Star team in 1984 while playing both the outfield and first base. Sax played 14 seasons (8 of them with the Dodgers) and hit .281 with 444 steals. The Dodgers starting second baseman for most of the 1980s, he was the 1982 NL Rookie of the Year and a five time All-Star.

Notes

References 
Baseball-Reference season page
Baseball Almanac season page

External links 
1978 Los Angeles Dodgers uniform
Los Angeles Dodgers official web site

Los Angeles Dodgers seasons
Los Angeles Dodgers season
National League West champion seasons
National League champion seasons
Los Angel